Anheuser-Busch Brewing Association Building, also known as the Lobaugh Building and Henry County Museum and Cultural Arts Center, is a historic Anheuser-Busch distribution building located at Clinton, Henry County, Missouri.  It was built in 1886, and is one- to two-story, Romanesque Revival style timber frame building with brick load bearing walls. It sits on a limestone foundation.  It features a dramatic three stepped parapet wall topped with limestone caps, decorative ornaments, Eselohren (mule ears), bands of voussoir trimmed windows, and semicircular arched windows.  It housed Anheuser-Busch operations until 1920, after which it housed a feed and produce business, and later a local history museum.

It was listed on the National Register of Historic Places in 1991. It is located in the Clinton Square Historic District.

References

External links
Henry County Museum website

History museums in Missouri
Individually listed contributing properties to historic districts on the National Register in Missouri
Commercial buildings on the National Register of Historic Places in Missouri
Romanesque Revival architecture in Missouri
Commercial buildings completed in 1886
Buildings and structures in Henry County, Missouri
National Register of Historic Places in Henry County, Missouri
Anheuser-Busch